A dry deck shelter (DDS) is a removable module that can be attached to a submarine to allow divers easy exit and entrance while the boat is submerged. The host submarine must be specially modified to accommodate the DDS, with the appropriate mating hatch configuration, electrical connections, and piping for ventilation, divers' air, and draining water. The DDS can be used to deploy a SEAL Delivery Vehicle submersible, Navy divers, or Combat Rubber Raiding Craft (CRRC).

Active and future DDS-capable submarines

Royal Navy
In UK service it is formally named the Special Forces Payload Bay (SFPB) and was procured under ‘Project Chalfont’
 Training is conducted at the purpose-built Chalfont Shore Facility (CSF) constructed by BAE Systems at HMNB Clyde.

United States Navy
They have three HY-80 steel sections within the outer glass-reinforced plastic (GRP) fairing: a spherical hyperbaric chamber at the forward end to treat injured divers; a smaller spherical transfer trunk; and a cylindrical hangar with elliptical ends. The hangar can support a SEAL Delivery Vehicle (SDV) submersible, six Navy SEALs to man the SDV, and a crew of Navy Divers to operate the DDS and launch the SDV; or 20 SEALs with four Combat Rubber Raiding Craft (CRRC). The SDV release team consists of 2 officers, 2 enlisted technicians, and 18 divers.

The two SEAL delivery vehicle teams report to Naval Special Warfare Group 3.

There are currently six portable dry deck shelters in use by the USN, the first one built by Electric Boat. The first, designated DDS-01S ("S" for starboard opening outer door), was completed in 1982. The remaining five, DDS-02P ("P" for port opening), -03P, -04S, -05S, and -06P, were built between 1987 and 1991 and were built by Newport News Shipbuilding. The shelters are maintained by a combined effort of Navy divers stationed on the teams and workers of the maintenance company Oceaneering International. They have expected useful lives of about 40 years each.

. The Ohio-class SSGNs are capable of supporting dual dry deck shelters.

Marine nationale

Barracuda-class submarine (France)

Former DDS-capable submarines
Former US Navy DDS-capable submarines include:

:

:

:
 
 
Note: The Benjamin Franklin-class special operations attack submarines were capable of supporting dual dry deck shelters.

Five s were also fitted to carry the DDS.

References

Submarine components
United States Navy SEALs